Film production companies based in Mumbai
2013 establishments in Maharashtra
Indian companies established in 2013
Mass media companies established in 2013